Melanie Greally is an Irish lawyer who is a judge of the High Court since 2022. She was a Circuit Court judge between 2014 and 2022 and was previously a barrister.

Early life 
Greally attended University College Dublin, from where she obtained a BCL degree in 1989.

Legal career 
After attending the King's Inns, she was called to the Bar in 1991. She appeared in criminal trials acting as prosecution barrister and defence counsel. She acted in High Court cases for the Minister for Justice in cases involving arrest warrants.

Judicial career

Circuit Court 
Greally became a judge of the Circuit Court in November 2014 and was assigned to the Dublin circuit in July 2015.

She has heard cases involving assault, money laundering, theft, dangerous driving, sexual offences and fraud. She was the presiding judge in the unsuccessful prosecution of Paul Murphy and others for the charge of false imprisonment of Joan Burton.

High Court 
She was nominated and appointed to the High Court in November 2022.

References

Living people
Year of birth missing (living people)
High Court judges (Ireland)
Irish women judges
Alumni of University College Dublin
Alumni of King's Inns
21st-century Irish judges
21st-century women judges
Circuit Court (Ireland) judges